Tabas (also Romanized as Ṭabas), formerly known as Golshan, is the capital city of Tabas County in South Khorasan Province of Iran. At the 2011 census, its population was 35,150, in 9,903 families.

Tabas is located in central Iran, 950 kilometers southeast of Tehran, in South Khorasan Province. At first, it was part of the Khorasan province, but in 2001, it was joined to the Yazd Province. However, in 2013, it was returned to Khorasan, and it became part of South Khorasan province. The name Khorasan means the land of the rising sun. There are two other places in Khorasan called Tabas, but the name Tabas usually refers to the city under discussion.

It is a desert city with many date and citrus trees. It has a 300-year-old public garden (Bagh-e-Golshan). There is also a shrine in Tabas that is visited every year by thousands of pilgrims. Tabas has two universities with 2,500 to 3,500 students. The city has hot summers, and people rarely see a winter snowfall.

The people of Tabas speak a Khorasani accent of Persian that sounds somewhat different from the standard Iranian version ("Tehrani accent").

History 
The history of Tabas dates back to pre-Islamic times. It was an important outpost of the Sassanid empire, and during the Muslim conquest of Persia, it was considered the gateway to Khorasan. It was spared when the Mongols attacked Iran. It had a local government incorporating not only Tabas but also Ferdows and Gonabad. After the death of Nader Shah in 1747, it as under the control of the Zangu'i Arabs as an independent state which included nearby Tun. For a time they even kidnapped Nader Mirza Afshar and placed the Kurds of Khabushan in control of Mashhad.

In 1978, the 7.4  Tabas earthquake affected the city with a maximum Mercalli intensity of IX (Violent). At least 15,000 people were killed. Since then, the city has been rebuilt with many new streets, parks and public buildings.

Climate 
Tabas has a hot desert climate (Köppen BWh).

Operation Eagle Claw 

The failed rescue American operation Operation Eagle Claw on 24–25 April 1980 to free American hostages in Tehran occurred near Tabas. In Iran, the operation is called amaliat tabas (Tabas operation), and the significance and aftermath of the failed operation made the city Tabas known in almost every corner of Iran. The Tabas air defense system is accordingly named so.

Transport 
Multiple bus lines, a railroad station and an airport connect Tabas to Mashhad, Yazd, Tehran, Kerman and Birjand (the capital city of South Khorasan province).

Agricultural products 
ُThe agricultural products of this desert city are very significant. Products such as: oranges, pistachios, dates, persimmons, summer fruits and daffodils; Also, tea bread, chickpea bread, and jams that are prepared from agricultural products, such as: spring orange jam, balang jam, orange peel jam, and Tabas mountain and local liqueurs.

Mines 
Tabas has some of the richest coal mines of Iran.

Notable people 
 Abbas Vaez-Tabasi, born 25 June 1935 in Tabas; Grand Imam and Chairman of the Astan Quds Razavi board
 Massoud Rajavi, born 18 August 1948 in Tabas; one of the two leaders of the People's Mujahedin of Iran

Gallery

References 

Populated places in Tabas County
Cities in South Khorasan Province
Oases of Iran
Cities destroyed by earthquakes

pnb:شہرستان طبس